
Giannitsa Lake, also known as Loudias Lake is a former post-glacial lake in Central Macedonia, Greece, south of the town of Giannitsa and north of Gidas (later renamed Alexandreia). It or the surrounding marshland were sometimes called Borboros 'slime' or Borboros Limen. Shallow, swampy, and variable-sized, it was drained from 1928 to 1932 and became agricultural land.

History 
It was fed by the Loudias River and the plain of Roumlouki stretched to its south.

In Bulgarian the lake was called Enidzhevardarsko Lake (Ениджева̀рдарското езеро) or Pazarsko Swamp (Пазарското блато).

The Lake played a major role in the Macedonian Struggle between the Greeks and Bulgarians, as it provided hiding places for the armed bands of both sides. The conflict for control of the Lake is the central historical event of Penelope Delta's 1937 novel The Secrets of the Swamp.

The lake was drained in 1928-1932 by the New York Foundation Company.

Gallery

Notes

External links

 Google Earth view of Giannitsa and the drained lakebed

Lakes of Greece
Landforms of Central Macedonia
Former lakes of Europe